The Santacrucian age is a period of geologic time (17.5 – 16.3 Ma) within the Early Miocene epoch of the Neogene, used more specifically with SALMA classification in South America. It follows the Colhuehuapian and precedes the Friasian age.

Etymology 
The age is named after the Santa Cruz Formation in the Austral/Magallanes Basin of southern Patagonia, Argentina and Chile.

Formations

Fossils

References

Bibliography 
Santa Cruz Formation
 
 
 
 
 
 
 
 
 
 
 
 
 
 
 
 

Aisol Formation
 
 

Cantaure Formation
 

Castillo Formation
 
 
 
 
 

Cerro Boleadores Formation
 

Chaguaramas Formation
 

Chilcatay Formation
 
 
 
 

Cura-Mallín Group
 
 
 

Gran Bajo del Gualicho Formation
 

Jimol Formation
 
 
 
 
 
 
 
 

Mariño Formation
 
 
 
 
 

Pinturas Formation
 
 

Río Yuca Formation
 

 
Miocene South America
Neogene Argentina
.017Santacrucian